Joseph Nikolajevič Galatte (Russian: Иосиф Николаевич Галатте; 1760 - 1816) was an Italian-born commander in the Imperial Russian Army during the Napoleonic Wars.

Life
Born into a Piedmontese noble family, he initially joined the Sardinian army, before transferring to the Russian army on 12 July 1799. He took part in the campaigns against the French in Italy and Switzerland in 1799 and in Bohemia and Moravia in 1805. On 30 January 1806 he was promoted to lieutenant colonel and on 26 May the same year was appointed to the retinue of His Imperial Majesty's Quartermaster.

He took part in the Second Archipelago Expedition into the Mediterranean under Vice Admiral Dmitry Senyavin in the Mediterranean, particularly the capture of the island of Tenedos, for which he was awarded the Order of Saint George 4th class on 9 September 1807. and was, in particular, in the capture of the island of Tenedos, for that on September 9 1807, she was awarded the Order of St. George 4th class - the citation read:

He became a major in Sveaborg on 6 September 1810, and colonel on 20 November the same year. He volunteered for the 1812 campaign and the advance across Germany, winning the Order of St Vladimir 3rd class for his conduct at the battle of Dennewitz and a gold sword with diamonds for that at Leipzig. He was promoted to major general on 15 December 1813, and was granted the Order of Saint Anna 1st class for his conduct at the battle of Saint-Dizier. He was dismissed from the army on 5 April 1816, but allowed to retain his uniform.

References

Sources

External links
https://web.archive.org/web/20160331183144/http://www.museum.ru/museum/1812/Persons/Slovar/sl_g01.html

1760 births
1816 deaths
Russian commanders of the Napoleonic Wars
Russian people of Italian descent
Military personnel from Piedmont